Algiers is an unincorporated community and census-designated place (CDP) in the town of Guilford, Vermont, United States.

History 

Algiers was first known as East Guilford. The first known buildings built were the Tracy House in 1789, the Broad Brook Grange in 1791, the Broad Brook House in 1816, and the Christ Church in 1817.  The village was named by Brattleboro residents who played a group of people from East Guilford in cribbage every Wednesday. They named them Algerian Pirates and the name stayed.  In 1823, the Tontine Building was built with apartments and retail space. Sometime in the 1790s, the first grist mill in town was built in Algiers. The Christ Church was the first Episcopal church in Vermont. The Guilford Congregational Church was built in Algiers in 1854. The first schoolhouse in Algiers, built in the 1790s, was converted into a barn, and later burned down. The second schoolhouse, built in the 1820s, burned down from an over-heated woodstove in 1853. In 1854, the third schoolhouse was built, and was abandoned in 1955 when the Guilford Central School was built, and has since been used as commercial space for local businesses. In 1949, the Congregational Church suffered a fire; this, along with several other fires in the preceding fifteen years, one of which was fatal, spurred the formation of the Broad Brook Fire Control in Algiers later that year. Two weeks later, it became the Guilford Volunteer Fire Department. The fire station was in the Broad Brook Garage in 1950, then on Guilford Center Road, near Buck Hill Drive, from 1951 until 1954. The next was built where the present one stands and was torn down in 2005 to make way for the new station. Algiers was incorporated by the State of Vermont as a village in 2005. Algiers is now undergoing a large rehabilitation project that will build a new apartment complex, a new mixed-use building, and refurbish two apartment buildings, including the Tontine Building, now to be called the Tontine-Canal Housing Complex.

References

Census-designated places in Vermont
Census-designated places in Windham County, Vermont
Unincorporated communities in Vermont
Unincorporated communities in Windham County, Vermont